Cubi VII is a sculpture by David Smith in the Art Institute of Chicago North Stanley McCormick Memorial Court (aka North Garden) north of the Art Institute of Chicago Building in the Loop community area of Chicago, Illinois.  

It is a stainless steel work of art created in 1963 and part of the Cubi series of stainless steel works housed around the world.

See also
 List of public art in Chicago

Notes

1963 sculptures
Outdoor sculptures in Chicago
Sculptures by David Smith
Sculptures of the Art Institute of Chicago
Steel sculptures in Illinois